Cillenus lateralis is a species of ground beetle native to Europe.

References

lateralis
Beetles described in 1819
Beetles of Europe
Taxa named by George Samouelle